Lovely is a 1979 Indian Malayalam-language film,  directed by N. Sankaran Nair and produced by Sherif Kottarakkara. The film stars M. G. Soman, Sukumaran, Sudheer and Lolitha. The film was scored by M. K. Arjunan.

Cast

Thikkurissy Sukumaran Nair
Kottayam Santha
Krishnachandran
Manavalan Joseph
Paul Vengola
Sukumaran
Roopa Devi
Baby Sumathi
Baby Vengola
Khadeeja
Lolitha
M. G. Soman
R. S. Manohar
P. K. Abraham
Pala Thankam
Sudheer

Soundtrack
The music was composed by M. K. Arjunan and the lyrics were written by TV Gopalakrishnan.

References

External links
 

1979 films
1970s Malayalam-language films